Geodermatophilus siccatus is a Gram-positive and aerobic bacterium from the genus Geodermatophilus which has been isolated from arid sand near Ourba in Chad.

References

Bacteria described in 2013
Actinomycetia